Melvin Shane Sparks (born June 25, 1969) is an American hip-hop choreographer best known for his work as a choreographer on So You Think You Can Dance and judge on America's Best Dance Crew.

Early life

Sparks was born in Cincinnati, Ohio. He is the youngest of three children born to Melvin and Wanda Sparks, both officers in the police force. Sparks spent some time in the hospital after his birth due to scoliosis. He became interested in dance at the age of 11 when he started performing in talent shows. His interest in teaching became apparent when he started offering dance lessons from his own backyard. Dance became extremely important to Sparks after his sister's boyfriend was murdered, as it became a way for him to escape and feel safe.

Career

Dance career
In 1993, Sparks left his hometown to move to Los Angeles. Here, he began making a name for himself as a choreographer. Several projects such as the feature film You Got Served and Fox's hit TV show So You Think You Can Dance made Sparks a force to be reckoned with. His solid resume of credits and awards today reflect his deep passion for dance and people of all ages and races admire his style of dance and suave attitude.

From a young age, Sparks knew his talent and gift was dance. Three months after his move to Los Angeles, he was offered a chance to substitute a hip-hop class at the Millennium Dance Complex, formerly known as Moro Landis, located in the North Hollywood Arts District. He soon became an assistant for this hip-hop class. When the teacher left, he took over the whole class. Due to his skill as a teacher and dancer, his class expanded from only three people to a record high of 175 people.

So You Think You Can Dance
Sparks is best known for being one of the judges and choreographers on the reality dance competition, So You Think You Can Dance. According to TV Guide, Gaynor accepted the role.

The show features a broad variety of American and international dance styles including classical, contemporary, ballroom, hip-hop, street, club, jazz, and musical theatre styles, amongst others, with many subgenres within the categories represented.

America's Best Dance Crew
Sparks was a judge on MTV's dance competition reality show America's Best Dance Crew from seasons 1 to 4. He did not return to judge for the fifth season due to his arrest. Singer Omarion replaced Sparks during season 5. Omarion left after season 5, so he could focus on his music career. In season 6, D-Trix from Quest crew took over the spot as the third judge.

Legal issues 
Sparks was arrested on Friday the 18th December 2009 on a felony warrant. Dancer Monique Fronti alleged that Sparks sexually assaulted her while she was underage. Sparks pled no contest and was charged with committing non-forcible sex acts with an underage girl. He was sentenced to serve 135 days in a "pay-to-stay" jail, and did so over the course of two years while continuing to work and travel internationally. Sparks was not required to register as a sex offender under the terms of his no contest plea.

References 

1969 births
American choreographers
America's Best Dance Crew
Living people
So You Think You Can Dance choreographers